The U.S. Post Office (also known as the Main Post Office) at 95 North County Road in Palm Beach, Florida is a historic building. On July 21, 1983, it was added to the U.S. National Register of Historic Places.

See also 
List of United States post offices

References

External links 

 Palm Beach County listings at National Register of Historic Places
 Palm Beach County listings at Florida's Office of Cultural and Historical Programs

Palm Beach, Florida
National Register of Historic Places in Palm Beach County, Florida
Palm Beach, Florida